Obed Chukwuma Ariri  (born April 4, 1956) is a Nigerian-born former placekicker of American football in the National Football League (NFL) for the Tampa Bay Buccaneers and Washington Redskins.  He also played in the United States Football League (USFL) for the Washington Federals and in the Arena Football League (AFL) for the Miami Hooters.  Ariri was born in Nigeria, and his middle name Chukwuma means "God Only Knows".  He became a skilled soccer player and was scouted by Clemson University's soccer coach Ibrahim M. Ibrahim.  After watching him play in Nigeria, Ibrahim offered Ariri a soccer scholarship to Clemson on the spot. He is distinguished as being the first Nigerian to play in the NFL.

Early career
Ariri was enrolled at Clemson in 1977 when Clemson football coach Charlie Pell was in dire need of a kicker.  Dr. Ibrahim allowed Ariri to try out only if he agreed to continue to play soccer.  Pell agreed, and Ariri went on to nail every attempt thus securing his place as the kicker for the Tigers.  His scholarship was shifted to football and Pell insisted that Obed forget about soccer.  Ariri never kicked a football until he was at Clemson.

He was so popular in campus during his Senior year that "Obed Ariri for the Heisman Trophy" bumper stickers were made up.

In 1979 Ariri was granted permission to play in the 1979 NCAA Division I National Soccer Championships at Tampa Stadium in Tampa, Florida.  The Tigers lost 3–2 to Southern Illinois University Edwardsville.  Ariri's performance during the game led to a job offer with the Chicago Sting of the North American Soccer League, where he made four appearances during the 1980 season.

Professional career
Ariri was drafted in the seventh round of the 1981 NFL Draft by the Baltimore Colts but was cut from the team days before the season.  He was on the initial roster of the USFL's Washington Federals but did not last the entire season due to inconsistency and poor performance.  The Tampa Bay Buccaneers acquired Obed in the 1984 pre-season but was waived before final cuts.  After kicker Bill Capece flopped in the final Buccaneer pre-season game, Ariri was hired in time for the start of the regular season and he was their regular kicker that season, only to be released during the 1985 training camp.  He was nicknamed the "Automatic African" by his teammates.

 1983 - Washington Federals (USFL)
 1984 - Tampa Bay Buccaneers
 1987 - Washington Redskins (strike replacement player)
 1994 - Miami Hooters   (Arena Football League)

Honors
 Set 6 NCAA kicking records and tied another 3
 First Buccaneer to kick (3) 40 yard-plus field goals in a game
 1977 Made the longest field goal in Clemson history against Wake Forest (57 yards)
 1978 Made the longest field goal in Gator Bowl history (47 yards)
 1980 NCAA 1st Team All-American
 1998 Inducted into the Clemson Hall of Fame

Legacy
Young Nigerian soccer player Donald Igwebuike had idolized Ariri back in Nigeria.  Ariri encouraged Igwebuike to attend Clemson and inspired him to kick a football.  The young player attended Clemson and was looked after by Ariri.  After graduating Ariri even encouraged Coach Danny Ford to give Igwebuike a chance to kick for the football team.  Igwebuike not only made the team, he went on to the NFL and beat out Ariri for the kicking spot at Tampa Bay.

After his playing career concluded, Ariri has stayed in the Tampa Bay area, driving a taxicab in St. Petersburg, Florida.

References

1956 births
Living people
People from Owerri
Sportspeople from Imo State
Nigerian footballers
Association football forwards
Association football players that played in the NFL
Clemson Tigers men's soccer players
NCAA Division I Men's Soccer Tournament Most Outstanding Player winners
NITEL Vasco Da Gama F.C. players
Chicago Sting (NASL) players
North American Soccer League (1968–1984) players
Nigerian expatriate footballers
Nigerian expatriate sportspeople in the United States
Expatriate soccer players in the United States
Footballers who switched code
Nigerian players of American football
American football placekickers
Clemson Tigers football players
Washington Federals/Orlando Renegades players
Tampa Bay Buccaneers players
Washington Redskins players
National Football League replacement players
Miami Hooters players